is the 14th single released in Japan, and the first single released in the United States, by Japanese duo Pink Lady. The song was recorded for their debut American album Pink Lady. The duo debuted the song in May 1979 on a Leif Garrett TV special. The song's peak position in Japan on the Oricon chart was 19, and on the American Billboard charts was 37. This was the first release of the duo to fail to make the top 10 in Japan. In addition to the all-English version of the song which was a hit in the U.S., Pink Lady recorded a bilingual version for the album We Are Sexy, with the chorus in English and the verses in Japanese. The B-side of the single is a cover of The Left Banke's "Walk Away Renée".

Pink Lady became the first Japanese recording act to chart in America since Kyu Sakamoto ("Sukiyaki") 16 years earlier, and the first to have a hit sung in English, as Sakamoto's hit was sung in Japanese. Coincidentally, "Kiss in the Dark" was released a year before A Taste of Honey's Twice As Sweet album.  The album featured A Taste of Honey's cover of the song "Sukiyaki," which became a hit in the U.S.

In Japan, the single sold 350,000 copies. A re-recorded version of the song was included on the 2-disc greatest hits album, Innovation, released in December 2010.

Track listing

Charts

References

External links
 
 

Songs about kissing
1979 singles
1979 songs
Pink Lady (band) songs
English-language Japanese songs
Disco songs
Song recordings produced by Michael Lloyd
Elektra Records singles
Victor Entertainment singles